The 2020 Kansas Lottery 300 was a NASCAR Xfinity Series race held on October 17, 2020. It was contested over 200 laps on the  oval. It was the thirtieth race of the 2020 NASCAR Xfinity Series season, the fourth race of the playoffs, and the first race in the Round of 8. Stewart-Haas Racing driver Chase Briscoe collected his ninth win of the season.

Report

Background 

Kansas Speedway is a 1.5-mile (2.4 km) tri-oval race track in Kansas City, Kansas. It was built in 2001, and it currently hosts two annual NASCAR race weekends. The IndyCar Series also held races at the venue until 2011. The speedway is owned and operated by the International Speedway Corporation.

Entry list 

 (R) denotes rookie driver.
 (i) denotes driver who is ineligible for series driver points.

Qualifying 
Noah Gragson was awarded the pole based on competition based formula.

Qualifying results

Race

Race results

Stage Results 
Stage One
Laps: 45

Stage Two
Laps: 45

Final Stage Results 

Laps: 110

Race statistics 

 Lead changes: 10 among 6 different drivers
 Cautions/Laps: 10 for 45
 Time of race: 2 hours, 39 minutes, and 40 seconds
 Average speed:

References 

NASCAR races at Kansas Speedway
2020 in sports in Kansas
Kansas Lottery 300
2020 NASCAR Xfinity Series